Vir Chakra (pronunciation: ʋiːɾa tʃakɾa) is an Indian wartime military bravery award presented for acts of gallantry on the battlefield, in the air or at sea.

It is third in precedence in wartime gallantry awards and comes after the Param Vir Chakra and Maha Vir Chakra.

Origin
It was established by the President of India on 26 January 1950 (with effect from 15 August 1947). The statutes were amended on 12 January 1952 to readjust the order of wearing as new decorations were established.

It replaced the British Distinguished Service Cross (DSC), Military Cross (MC) and Distinguished Flying Cross (DFC). Award of the decoration carries with it the right to use Vr.C. as a postnominal abbreviation [note the care to distinguish this abbreviation from that for the Victoria Cross (V.C.)

Appearance
The medal is 1-3/8 inch circular silver medal. A five pointed star, with the chakra in the centre, and, on this, the domed gilded state emblem. The decoration is named on the rim and suspended from a swiveling straight-bar suspender. The decoration is almost always named and dated on the edge. Around a plain centre, two legends are separated by lotus flowers; with Vir Chakra in Hindi above and in English below. The ribbon is 32 mm, half dark blue and half orange-saffron; dark blue 16 mm, saffron 16 mm.

The award carries with it a cash allowance and, in some cases, a lump sum cash award. This has been a rather controversial issue throughout the life of the decoration. From 1 February 1999, the central government set a monthly stipend of Rs. 850 for recipients of the award. In addition, many states have established individual pension rewards for the recipients of the decoration.

List of Vir Chakra recipients 

A total of 1327 personnel received Vir Chakra. Some of the notable Vir Chakra awardees include:

References

Further reading

External links
 Vir Chakra awardees, TWDI

Military awards and decorations of India
Awards established in 1946
1950 establishments in India
Courage awards